Lehigh may refer to:

Places

United States
Lehigh, Iowa
Lehigh, Kansas
Lehigh, Oklahoma
Lehigh, Barbour County, West Virginia
Lehigh, Wisconsin
Lehigh Acres, Florida
Lehigh Township (disambiguation)
Lehigh Valley, a region in eastern Pennsylvania
Lehigh Canal, constructed along the Lehigh River
Lehigh County, Pennsylvania
Lehigh Valley AVA, Pennsylvania wine region
Lehigh County Ballpark, Allentown
Lehigh Gap, Pennsylvania, a mountain gap formed by the Lehigh River
Lehigh Valley Mall, a shopping mall in Whitehall Township, Pennsylvania
Lehigh Parkway, a park in Allentown
Lehigh River, a tributary of the Delaware River
Lehigh Street, Allentown
Lehigh Tunnel, along the Northeast Extension of the Pennsylvania Turnpike
Little Lehigh Creek, a tributary of Jordan Creek

Fictional
 Lehigh Station, Pennsylvania, a fictional town in the television miniseries North and South

Businesses
 Lehigh & Susquehanna Turnpike (1804) a wagon road connecting Philadelphia, and other communities of the Lehigh and Delaware valleys to Western New York State and Lake Erie
 Lehigh Coal & Navigation Company (1818-1986) builders of the Lehigh Canal
 Lehigh Canal (1818) a privately funded canal
 Lehigh Coal and Navigation Company (1988–2010), a mining company
 Lehigh Crane Iron Company, a US foundry in operation from 1839 to 1899
 Lehigh Defense, an ammunition maker

Railroads
Lehigh and Hudson River Railway
Lehigh and Mahanoy Railroad - LC&N subsidiary
Lehigh and New England Railroad - LC&N subsidiary
Lehigh Valley Railroad

Other
Lehigh University, a private research university located in Bethlehem, Pennsylvania
691 Lehigh, a minor planet orbiting the Sun

See also